Praneel Naidu (born 29 January 1995) is a Fijian footballer who plays for Labasa F.C.. He represented Fiji in the football competition at the 2016 Summer Olympics.

References

External links

Fiji international footballers
1995 births
Living people
Footballers at the 2016 Summer Olympics
Olympic footballers of Fiji
Fijian footballers
Fijian people of Indian descent
Association football defenders
Ba F.C. players